Domkal subdivision is an administrative subdivision of Murshidabad district in the state of West Bengal, India.

Overview
The Bhagirathi River splits the Murshidabad district into two natural physiographic regions – Rarh on the west and Bagri on the east. Domkal subdivision lies in the Raninagar plain at the north-eastern corner of the Bagri region. The Raninagar plain lies between the Jalangi and Bhairab rivers. It is a low-lying area and is characterized by the nature of inundation along with many swamps. The Padma River separates Murshidabad district from Malda district and Chapai Nawabganj and Rajshahi districts of Bangladesh in the north.

Geography

Subdivisions
Murshidabad district is divided into the following administrative subdivisions:

Administrative units
Domkal subdivision has 4 police stations, 4 community development blocks, 4 panchayat samitis, 38 gram panchayats, 240 mouzas, 203 inhabited villages and 2 census towns. The census towns are: Islampur and Harharia Chak.
The subdivision has its headquarters at Domkal.

Police stations
Police stations in Domkal subdivision have the following features and jurisdiction:

Murshidabad district has a 125.35 km long international border with Bangladesh of which 42.35 km is on land and the remaining is riverine.

There are reports of Bangladeshi infiltrators entering Murshidabad district. An estimate made in 2000 places the total number of illegal Bangladeshi immigrants in India at 1.5 crore, with around 3 lakh entering every year. The thumb rule for such illegal immigrants is that for each illegal person caught four get through. While many immigrants have settled in the border areas, some have moved on, even to far way places such as Mumbai and Delhi. The border is guarded by the Border Security Force. During the UPA government, Sriprakash Jaiswal, Union Minister of State for Home Affairs, had made a statement in Parliament on 14 July 2004, that there were 12 million illegal Bangladeshi infiltrators living in India, and West Bengal topped the list with 5.7 million Bangladeshis. More recently, Kiren Rijiju, Minister of State for Home Affairs in the NDA government has put the figure at around 20 million. Critics point out that the Bengali politicians, particularly those from the ruling Trinamool Congress and the CPI (M), believe that a soft approach to the problem help them to win Muslim votes.

Blocks
Community development blocks in Domkal subdivision are:

Gram Panchayats
The subdivision contains 34 gram panchayats under 4 community development blocks 21 Ward comprising 23 mouzas under Domkal Municipality:

 Domkal CD Block –  Garaimari, Sarangpur, Bhagirathpur, Garibpur, Juranpur, Dhulauri, Ghoramara, Madhurkul and Raipur.
 Raninagar–I CD Block – Herampur, Islampurchak, Paharpur, Hurshi, Lochanpur and Tenkaraipur Balumati.
 Raninagar–II CD Block – Kalinagar–I, Katlamari–II, Rajapur, Kalinagar–II, Malibari–I, Raninagar–I, Katlamari–I, Malibari–II and Raninagar–II.
 Jalangi – Choapara, Ghoshpara, Khayramari, Sahebnagar, Debipur, Jalangi, Sadikhanderah, Faridpur, Katabari and Sagarpara.

River bank erosion
As of 2013, an estimated 2.4 million people reside along the banks of the Ganges alone in Murshidabad district. The main channel of the Ganges has a bankline of 94 km along its right bank from downstream of Farakka Barrage to Jalangi. Severe erosion occurs all along this bank. The encroaching river wiped out 50 mouzas and engulfed about 10,000 hectares of fertile land. The following blocks have to face the brunt of erosion year after year: Farakka, Samserganj, Suti I, Suti II, Raghunathganj II, Lalgola, Bhagawangola I, Bhagawangola II, Raninagar I, Raninagar II and Jalangi. As per official estimate, till 1992–94 more than 10,000 hectares of chars (flood plain sediment island) have developed in main places, which have become inaccessible from the Indian side but can be reached easily from Bangladesh.

See also – River bank erosion along the Ganges in Malda and Murshidabad districts

Economy

Infrastructure
All inhabited villages in Murshidabad district have power supply.

See the individual block pages for more information about the infrastructure available.

Agriculture
Murshidabad is a predominantly agricultural district. A majority of the population depends on agriculture for a living. The land is fertile. The eastern portion of the Bhagirathi, an alluvial tract, is very fertile for growing Aus paddy, jute and rabi crops. The Kalantar area in the south-eastern portion of the district, is a low-lying area with stiff dark clay and supports mainly the cultivation of Aman paddy. The west flank of the Bhagirathi is a lateritic tract intersected by numerous bils and old river beds. It supports the cultivation of Aman paddy, sugar cane and mulberry.

Given below is an overview of the agricultural production (all data in tonnes) for Domkal subdivision, other subdivisions and the Murshidabad district, with data for the year 2013–14.

Education
Murshidabad district had a literacy rate of 66.59% (for population of 7 years and above) as per the census of India 2011. Barhampur subdivision had a literacy rate of 72.60%, Kandi subdivision 66.28%, Jangipur subdivision 60.95%, Lalbag subdivision 68.00% and Domkal subdivision 68.35%.

Given in the table below (data in numbers) is a comprehensive picture of the education scenario in Murshidabad district for the year 2013–14:

Note: Primary schools include junior basic schools; middle schools, high schools and higher secondary schools include madrasahs; technical schools include junior technical schools, junior government polytechnics, industrial technical institutes, industrial training centres, nursing training institutes etc.; technical and professional colleges include engineering colleges, medical colleges, para-medical institutes, management colleges, teachers training and nursing training colleges, law colleges, art colleges, music colleges etc. Special and non-formal education centres include sishu siksha kendras, madhyamik siksha kendras, centres of Rabindra mukta vidyalaya, recognised Sanskrit tols, institutions for the blind and other handicapped persons, Anganwadi centres, reformatory schools etc.

The following institutions are located in Domkal subdivision:
Dumkal College was established in 1999 at Domkal.
Domkal Girls' College was established in 2011 at Domkal.
Jalangi Mahavidyalaya was established in 2010 at Jalangi.
Murshidabad Adarsha Mahavidyalaya was established in 1981 at Islampur.
G.D. College, a self-financed general degree college, was established at Shaikhpara in 2007.
Shaikhpara A.R.M. Polytechnic at Shaikhpara offers diploma courses in food processing technology, computer software technology and medical lab technology.
Murshidabad Minority BEd College at Sadikhanr Diar, affiliated to the University of Kalyani, offers a course in BEd

Healthcare
The table below (all data in numbers) presents an overview of the medical facilities available and patients treated in the hospitals, health centres and sub-centres in 2014 in Murshidabad district.  
 

.* Excluding nursing homes

Medical facilities in Domkal subdivision are as follows:
Hospitals: (Name, location, beds)
Domkal Subdivisional Hospital, Domkal, 68 beds

Rural Hospitals : (Name, block, location, beds)
Sadikhan's Dear Rural Hospital, Jalangi CD Block, Sadikhan's Dear, 30 beds
Islampur Rural Hospital, Raninagar I CD Block, Islampur, 30 beds
Raninagar (Godhanpara) Rural Hospital, Raninagar II CD Block, Raninagar, 15 beds

Block Primary Health Centres: (Name, block, location, beds)
Bhagirathpur BPHC, Domkal CD Block, Bhagirathpur, 10 beds

Primary Health Centres: (CD Block-wise)(CD Block, PHC location, beds)
Domkal CD Block: Garaimari (4), Jitpur (10)
Jalangi CD Block: Faridpur (4), Sagarpara (10)
Raninagar I CD Block: Hurshi, Maricha (6), Herampur (10)
Raninagar II CD Block: Bilpocha Kobra, Nabipur (6), Katlamari (10)

Electoral constituencies
Lok Sabha (parliamentary) and Vidhan Sabha (state assembly) constituencies in Domkal subdivision were as follows:

References

Subdivisions of West Bengal
Subdivisions in Murshidabad district